Norman MacMillan may refer to:
 Norman Macmillan (RAF officer), (1892–1976), British pilot
 Norman MacMillan (politician), Quebec provincial politician
 Norman John MacMillan (1909–1978), president of Canadian National Railway, 1967–1974
Norm McMillan, baseball player